Sodium pyrosilicate is the chemical compound .  It is one of the sodium silicates, specifically a pyrosilicate, formally a salt of the unstable pyrosilicic acid .

Structure
The anhydrous solid has the triclinic crystal structure, with space group P (a = 5.8007(8) Å, b = 11.5811(15) Å, c = 23.157(3) Å, α = 89.709(10)°, β = 88.915(11)°, γ = 89.004(11)°, V = 1555.1(4) Å3, Z = 8, Dx = 2.615 g·cm−3, μ(Mo‐Kα) = 7.94 cm−1).  The  anions are arranged in layers parallel to the (100) plane, with the sodium cations distributed in 24 distinct crystallographic positions, coordinated by 4 to 6 near oxygen atoms. Some of the 4-coordinated sodium atoms can be interpreted as parallel columns of edge-sharing  tetrahedra.  The columnar arrangement forms tunnels that house the remaining sodium cations.  Twinning at a microscopic scale simulates a much larger monoclinic C centered lattice (V′ = 6220 Å3, Z = 32).

See also
 Sodium metasilicate, 
 Sodium orthosilicate,

References

Sodium compounds